The Grand Rapids Blizzard were a women's professional basketball team in the National Women's Basketball League (NWBL).  Based in Grand Rapids, Michigan, they played in 2003.

External links
NWBL website (archive link)

Basketball teams in Michigan
2003 establishments in Michigan
Basketball teams established in 2003
2003 disestablishments in Michigan
Basketball teams disestablished in 2003
Sports in Grand Rapids, Michigan
Women's basketball teams in the United States
Women's sports in Michigan